Ivan Martić (born 2 October 1990) is a Swiss professional footballer who plays as a right-back for Romanian club Universitatea Cluj on loan from Universitatea Craiova.

Club career

St. Gallen and loan to Schaffhausen
Martić started his career in Swiss club St. Gallen, debuting for the reserve team, and going to loan to Schaffhausen, before establishing himself in FC St. Gallen's first team.

Hellas Verona
On 15 May 2014, Hellas Verona announced the signing of Martić.

Spezia
On 27 July 2015, after just one season in Verona, he went to Spezia.

Rijeka
On 26 July 2016, Martić signed a three-year contract with Rijeka in Croatia.

Universitatea Craiova
On 4 September 2017, it was revealed that Martić signed a three-year contract with CS Universitatea Craiova in Romania. On 22 April 2020, Martić was released from the club after having his contract mutually terminated.

Sion
On 31 August 2020 he joined Sion.

Return to Romania
Having returned to Universitatea Craiova in 2022, Martić signed for Universitatea Cluj on loan until the end of the season in February 2023.

International career
Born in Switzerland, Martić is eligible to represent three countries at international level: Switzerland, Croatia and Bosnia and Herzegovina.

In 2015, he claimed he wanted to play for Bosnia and Herzegovina since his family hails from city of Derventa.

Honours
St. Gallen
Challenge League: 2011–12

HNK Rijeka
1. HNL: 2016–17
Croatian Cup: 2016–17

Universitatea Craiova
Cupa României: 2017–18
Supercupa României runner-up: 2018

References

External links

Player profile at oleole.com

1990 births
Living people
Sportspeople from the canton of St. Gallen
Swiss people of Croatian descent
Swiss people of Bosnia and Herzegovina descent
Association football fullbacks
Croatian footballers
Croatian expatriate footballers
Swiss Super League players
Serie A players
Serie B players
Croatian Football League players
Liga I players
FC St. Gallen players
FC Schaffhausen players
Hellas Verona F.C. players
Spezia Calcio players
HNK Rijeka players
CS Universitatea Craiova players
FC Sion players
FC Universitatea Cluj players
Expatriate footballers in Italy
Expatriate footballers in Romania
Swiss expatriate sportspeople in Italy
Swiss expatriate sportspeople in Romania